Seymour Parker Gilbert (October 13, 1892 - February 23, 1938) was an American lawyer, banker, politician and diplomat. He is chiefly known for being Agent General for Reparations to Germany, from October 1924 to May 1930. Afterwards, in 1931, he became an associate at J. P. Morgan.

Early life
Parker Gilbert was the son of Seymour Parker and Carrie Jennings ( Cooper) Gilbert.  Gilbert was educated at Rutgers College, graduating at the age of 19, and received a L.L.B. from Harvard Law School at 22, where he was the editor of the Harvard Law Review from 1913-1915, and later an honorary degree in 1930 for his work in reparations.

Career

From 1915-1918, he practiced law with Cravath and Henderson in New York.

At age 27, he was offered a cabinet post in the Wilson Administration, as Assistant Secretary of the Treasury, and continued to serve in the Harding Administration. In 1924, he was appointed Agent General for Reparations by the Allied Reparations Commission, succeeding the temporary Owen D. Young. In that capacity, he was responsible for the execution of the Dawes Plan. Under the Young Plan, the Bank for International Settlements was created, nullifying the position of Parker Gilbert.

Gilbert served as Under Secretary of the Treasury from June 1921 – 1923 as well as Agent General of Reparations from October 1924 until May 1930, working with Weimar Germany to ensure loan repayments to America. Afterwards, in 1931, he became an associate at J. P. Morgan, where he was known to put in long hours at the firm.

Personal life
He died at age 45, from a heart attack. His son S. Parker Gilbert, born 1934, was chairman of Morgan Stanley during the 1980s. After his death, his wife, Louise Todd, married Harold Stanley, the co-founder of Morgan Stanley.

References

 The papers of S. Parker Gilbert

External links
 Genius Rewarded
 

 

 
 
 

1892 births
1938 deaths
Rutgers University alumni
Harvard Law School alumni
20th-century American lawyers
American bankers
American diplomats
United States Department of the Treasury officials
Cravath, Swaine & Moore people